The 1979 Baltimore Orioles season was a season in American baseball. The Orioles finished first in the American League East division of Major League Baseball with a record of 102 wins and 57 losses. They went on to defeat the California Angels in the 1979 American League Championship Series, 3 games to 1, before losing in the 1979 World Series to the Pittsburgh Pirates, 4 games to 3.

Season overview 
The 1979 season represents a turning point in Orioles history. Attendance was poor before the year and terrific after it, steadily rising into the 1990s as a new ballpark coming in the form of Camden Yards arrived on the scene. Also, ownership changed hands in 1979, with a 12-million-dollar sale marking the change from Jerry Hoffberger's Baltimore Baseball Group—a local, family-oriented operation—to Edward Bennett Williams, a powerhouse attorney from Washington, D.C. with ideas about moving the club to the nation's capital.

Against the backdrop of noise and tension, the club played well, winning 102 games and the American League East title for the first time since 1974. The season was a return to glory days of the late '60s and early '70s under manager Earl Weaver, but this club was different in nature and spirit. The talent was not as dominant, but a blend of heart, skills, and original personalities produced a team as compelling and effective as any in Orioles history. To note, Weaver used 140 different lineups during the regular season. 

Years later, it is still hard to say what happened in the summer of 1979, what caused Orioles games at Memorial Stadium to become more popular. It didn't hurt that pro football's Baltimore Colts, which was more popular for a long time, were coming apart under owner Robert Irsay; with the team losing and Irsay threatening to move, fans were abandoning the franchise and looking for an alternative. Another factor was a change in the Orioles' flagship radio station: After 22 years on WBAL, the games were now on WFBR, a smaller, lively station with a younger audience.

Offseason 
 December 4, 1978: Jeff Schneider was drafted by the Orioles from the Philadelphia Phillies in the 1978 rule 5 draft.
 December 21, 1978: Steve Lake was purchased from the Orioles by the Milwaukee Brewers.
 January 16, 1979: Mike Dimmel was traded by the Orioles to the St. Louis Cardinals for Benny Ayala.
 March 26, 1979: Elrod Hendricks was released by the Orioles.

Regular season

A new owner 
The team had won 90 games and drawn 1.05 million fans in 1978, maintaining a depressing attendance level that hadn't changed in 25 years. With player salaries rising and profits falling, Hoffberger was under pressure from his family to sell. He announced in 1978 that he would entertain offers, and Williams's purchase was completed in August '79. The lawyer said he would move to Washington only if attendance continued to disappoint, although crowds had already begun to swell earlier in the season, before Williams laid down his challenge.

The players 
The '79 Orioles didn't have a high payroll, but they won with a blend of intelligence, strong fundamentals, and guile. An amalgam of All-Stars and role players who jelled under Weaver's forceful hand, they pitched well, made key plays, hit in the clutch, came from behind, and won games in unusual ways. The phenomenon was given a nickname: "Oriole Magic".

Offense 
Those carrying the heaviest loads on offense were outfielder Ken Singleton, who had a career year with 35 homers and 111 RBIs and finished second in the American League MVP voting and first baseman Eddie Murray, who had 25 homers and just missing 100 RBI, with a total of 99.

Rich Dauer, Kiko Garcia, and Doug DeCinces filled out the infield, with Garcia, a farm-system product, taking over for aging Mark Belanger at shortstop. Al Bumbry batted leadoff, stole 37 bases, and ran down balls in center field. Rick Dempsey hit just .239, but his get-dirty style behind the plate made him a fan favorite.

Weaver's idea of platooning veteran John Lowenstein and rookie Gary Roenicke in left field was surprisingly successful. Roenicke, acquired in the Montreal deal, had 25 homers and 64 RBI in his first full season in the majors. Lowenstein, acquired from the Texas Rangers on waivers after the '78 season, added 11 homers and 34 RBIs.

Weaver also found places to plug in reserve outfielder Pat Kelly, who batted .288; pinch hitter deluxe Terry Crowley, who batted .317, and Benny Ayala, a reserve outfielder with a knack for extra-base hits. Lee May still received the majority of the designated hitter at-bats, producing 19 homers and 69 RBIs.

Pitching 
Pitching was still the heart of the club. The Orioles had the AL's lowest team ERA (3.28, more than a half-run lower than the next best team ERA) and limited opponents to a .241 average, the league's lowest by 12 points. The staff was led by Mike Flanagan, whose 23–9 record, 3.08 ERA, and 16 complete games earned him the AL Cy Young Award. After Flanagan, there was Dennis Martínez (15-16, 18 complete games), Scott McGregor (13-6), Steve Stone (11-7), and Jim Palmer (10-6), who was injured and failed to win 20 games for only the second time in the '70s. The bullpen, with Don Stanhouse, left-hander Tippy Martinez, and right-handers Tim Stoddard and Sammy Stewart, had 28 wins and 30 saves.

Stanhouse, a closer acquired in a six-player deal with the Montreal Expos before the 1978 season, made the AL All-Star team despite a habit of narrowly escaping jams.  Weaver nicknamed Stanhouse "Full Pack", as in the full pack of cigarettes Weaver nervously smoked to help him get through Stanhouse's appearances.  Flanagan called Stanhouse "Stan the Man Unusual," a play on the nickname of Hall of Famer Stan "The Man" Musial.

"Wild Bill" 
In section 34 in the upper deck down the right-field line, a bearded cab driver named "Wild" Bill Hagy became the symbol of the awakening. He would rise from his seat, stand in front of his section, and spell out O-R-I-O-L-E-S with his body, twisting his arms and legs into recognizable facsimiles of the letters. When other, nearby sections joined in the cheer, it grew in popularity until the entire ballpark was following Hagy's lead, sending roaring cheers into the night.

Season standings

Record vs. opponents

Notable transactions 
 June 26, 1979: John Stefero was signed by the Orioles as an amateur free agent.
 September 1, 1979: Elrod Hendricks was signed as a free agent by the Orioles.

Roster

Player stats

Batting

Starters by position 
Note: Pos = Position; G = Games played; AB = At bats; H = Hits; Avg. = Batting average; HR = Home runs; RBI = Runs batted in

Other batters 
Note: G = Games played; AB = At bats; H = Hits; Avg. = Batting average; HR = Home runs; RBI = Runs batted in

Pitching

Starting pitchers 
Note: G = Games pitched; IP = Innings pitched; W = Wins; L = Losses; ERA = Earned run average; SO = Strikeouts

Other pitchers 
Note: G = Games pitched; IP = Innings pitched; W = Wins; L = Losses; ERA = Earned run average; SO = Strikeouts

Relief pitchers 
Note: G = Games pitched; W = Wins; L = Losses; SV = Saves; ERA = Earned run average; SO = Strikeouts

Postseason

ALCS 

The Orioles won the Series, 3 games to 1, over the California Angels.

World Series 

NL Pittsburgh Pirates (4) vs. AL Baltimore Orioles (3)

Awards and honors 
 Earl Weaver, Associated Press AL Manager of the Year

Farm system

Notes

References 

1979 Baltimore Orioles team page at Baseball Reference
1979 Baltimore Orioles season at baseball-almanac.com

Baltimore Orioles seasons
Baltimore Orioles season
American League East champion seasons
American League champion seasons
Baltimore Orioles